Clarence Town is both a primarily rural locality and a township in the Dungog Shire local government area in the Hunter Region of New South Wales, Australia. The locality is bisected by the Williams River.

History
The area was originally inhabited by the Wanaruah Aboriginal people who called it Erringhi.

The first Europeans to arrive in Clarence Town was  William Paterson  and explorer Francis Barrellier in 1801 exploring the Hunter River . 1801 convicts were cutting timber in area. In 1826 after a number of cedar cutter moved to an area a village was created.

The township is most famous for building and launching the William IV paddle steamer in 1831, although the town was still called Erringhi at this time. It was later renamed in 1832 after the Duke of Clarence, who became King William IV in 1830.
In 1886 the town was described as:The land on the river-banks, consisting chiefly of alluvial flats, is remarkably fertile. This is largely due to the floods of past ages. wheat, maize, barley, oats and potatoes are produced in abundance. Tobacco is now grown and the grape and orange are cultivated with success. The population is 370. 

There is a hotel in the main street of Clarence Town built in 1913 called The Erringhi Hotel.

Heritage listings 
Clarence Town has a number of heritage-listed sites, including:
 49 Grey Street: Clarence Town Courthouse
 567 Main Road: Clarence Town Bridge over Williams River

Demographics
In the  the locality had a population of approximately 2,100 while the township, which is the largest population centre in the area, had a population of 794.

Township
Clarence Town has its own post office (built about 1880), Medical Centre (Clarence Town Medical Centre), a Pharmacy, a supermarket (IGA), a primary school, several churches, a school of arts hall (which hosts many local events), a soccer club (home of the Clarencetown Cobras), a football field come cricket pitch, a fire station, police station, butcher shop, club, pub, hardware store and restaurant, a vet, a caravan park on the river and a swimming pool (home of the Clarencetown Comets swimming team). There are also several picnic spots and old houses and buildings to see.

Just out of town a little way is the Good Samaritan Donkey Sanctuary, which cares for mistreated donkeys. Visitors are welcomed; however appointments are required, except on advertised open days.

Disasters

In 2007 devastating floodwaters caused havoc in the Hunter Valley and claimed the lives of two people on a bridge into Clarence Town from Seaham, New South Wales.

Notes

  The population statistics provided by the Australian Bureau of Statistics for the suburb/locality include persons not actually resident in Clarence Town as well as excluding some Clarence Town residents so the figure shown is an approximation only.

References

 

Suburbs of Dungog Shire
Towns in the Hunter Region
Towns in New South Wales